The 2006–07 B Group was the 52nd season of the Bulgarian B Football Group, the second tier of the Bulgarian football league system. The season started on 12 August 2006 and finished on 2 June 2007 with the A Group promotion play-off between the runners-up from both divisions.

East B Group

Top scorers

West B Group

Top scorers

Promotion play-off

References 

Second Professional Football League (Bulgaria) seasons
2006–07 in Bulgarian football
Bulgaria